In Albania, the standard time is Central European Time (CET; UTC+01:00). Daylight saving time, which moves one hour ahead to Central European Summer Time, is observed from the last Sunday in March (02:00 CET) to the last Sunday in October (03:00 CEST). Albania adopted CET in 1914.

IANA time zone database 
In the IANA time zone database, Albania is given the zone Europe/Tirane.

See also 
Time in Europe
Time in Bosnia and Herzegovina
Time in Serbia

References

External links 
Current time in Albania at Time.is